The 2014 Medina hotel fire was a hotel fire that occurred in a hotel in Medina, Saudi Arabia. The fire killed at least 15 people and another 130 were injured.

History
Around seven hundred pilgrims from different countries were staying at the hotel in Medina to perform the Umrah. An electrical short circuit caused a fire to break out in the hotel. According to a local government statement the fire was first reported at 6:30 pm ET, and the blaze was contained by 9:00 pm ET. Fifteen Egyptian pilgrims were killed and one hundred and thirty other pilgrims were injured as a result of the fire. Preliminary indications suggested that those who were killed died of suffocation. The Egyptian consul general in the city of Jiddah, told reporters that most of the injured were Egyptians and that two children were among the dead. It took the rescue teams around two hours to put out the fire completely.

References

Hotel fires
2014 in Saudi Arabia
Fires in Saudi Arabia
2014 fires in Asia
Medina
February 2014 events in Asia
2014 disasters in Saudi Arabia